Julius Langfeld (born 18 February 1995) is a German footballer who plays as a right winger for Regionalliga Nord club TSV Havelse.

Career
Langfeld made his professional debut for TSV Havelse in the 3. Liga on 24 July 2021 against 1. FC Saarbrücken.

References

External links
 
 
 
 

1995 births
Living people
People from Minden
Sportspeople from Detmold (region)
Footballers from North Rhine-Westphalia
German footballers
Association football midfielders
TSV Havelse players
3. Liga players
Regionalliga players